Bill Kenny may refer to:

Bill Kenny (English footballer), English soccer forward
Bill Kenny (Australian footballer) (1897–1978), Australian rules footballer for South Melbourne
Bill Kenny (singer) (1914–1978), African American singer, tenor with The Ink Spots
Bill Kenny (hurler) (1899–1978), Irish hurler

See also
Bill Kenney (born 1955), American football player
Bill Kenney (American football coach), American football coach at Western Michigan University
Billy Kenny (disambiguation)
William Kenny (disambiguation)